Swami Vivekananda Stadium is a multi-purpose stadium in the capital city of Tripura in Agartala. The ground has capacity of 8,000 persons. The ground is located 2 km away from the city center and stadium was inaugurated.

The stadium is one of the best and most modern in Northeast India with an area of  7350 sqm and also has press box as well as grandstand and Government had sent Rs 9 crore for construction of the stadium .

The stadium has hosted many political rallies as well. Indian Prime Minister Narendra Modi also hosted rally during 2014 prime ministerial campaign.

The stadium one of the three important stadium in Tripura after Maharaja Bir Bikram College Stadium and Badharghat Stadium.

References

Multi-purpose stadiums in India
Cricket grounds in Tripura
Sports venues in Agartala
Sports venues completed in 2013
2013 establishments in Tripura